Bastard may refer to:

Parentage
 Illegitimate child, a child born to unmarried parents
 Bastard (law of England and Wales), illegitimacy in English law

People

People with the name
 Bastard (surname), including a list of people with that name

People with the epithet
 Anthony, bastard of Burgundy (1421–1504), half-brother of Charles the Bold
 Antonio I the Bastard, Antonio I Acciaioli (died 1435), illegitimate son of Nerio I of Athens
 Basil the Parakoimomenos or Basil the Nothos (both "Basil the Bastard"), Basil Lekapenos ( 925 – c. 985), Greek illegitimate child of Romanos I Lekapenos
 Bastard of Arran, Sir James Hamilton of Finnart (1495–1540), Scottish nobleman and architect
 Bastard of Fauconberg, Thomas Neville (1429–1471), Lancastrian leader in the War of the Roses
 Bastard of Orleans, Jean de Dunois (1402–1468), illegitimate son of Louis d'Orléans
 The Bastard of Roussillon, illegitimate son of Catalan Nuño Sánchez
 The Bastard of Vaurus, defended the French town in the siege of Meaux in 1422
 Corneille, bastard of Burgundy (1420–1452), illegitimate son of Philip the Good
 Geoffrey, the Bastard, Geoffrey, Archbishop of York (c. 1152–1212), illegitimate son of Henry II, King of England
 Henry the Bastard, Henry II of Castile (1334–1379), illegitimate child of King Alfonso XI of Castile 
 James II (the Bastard) of Cyprus (1439–1473), illegitimate son of John II of Cyprus
 Jean de Lescun, the Bastard of Armagnac (died 1473), French ally of King Louis XI of France
 João the Bastard, John I of Portugal (1357–1433), King of Portugal and the Algarve, 1385–1433
 John I the Bastard, John I Doukas of Thessaly (died 1289), ruler of Thessaly
 Lionel, Bastard of Vendôme, captured Joan of Arc at the siege of Compiègne in 1430
 Lo Bord del rei d'Arago (literally "The Bastard of the King of Aragon"), unknown composer in Occitan
 Robert the Bastard, Robert, 1st Earl of Gloucester (before 1100–1147), illegitimate son of King Henry I of England
 Robert Bruce (bastard), Lord of Liddesdale (died 1332), illegitimate son of King Robert I of Scotland
 Thomas of Galloway (bastard) (c. 1175–1234), illegitimate son of Alan of Galloway
 William the Bastard, William the Conqueror King of England (1028–1087)

Arts, entertainment, and media

Fictional characters
 Harry the Bastard, from the British 1990s television series Bottom
 Philip the Bastard or Philip Faulconbridge, a character in Shakespeare's play King John
 Raymond the Bastard, from an episode of the 2004 British Max and Paddy's Road to Nowhere
 Ywain the Bastard, a Knight of the Round Table in later Arthurian legend
 Jon Snow (character), often referred to as "Eddard 'Ned' Stark's bastard son", or simply "Bastard", in Game of Thrones
 Ramsay Snow (later legitimized as Ramsay Bolton), often referred to as "Roose Bolton's bastard son", in Game of Thrones
 Vyvyan Basterd, character in 80's British comedy series The Young Ones
 Fat Bastard, Austin Powers character

Films
 Bastard (1940 film), a Swedish-Norwegian film
 Bastard (1997 film), a Polish-German-French film
 I bastardi (The Bastards), the original Italian title of the 1968 film released in English as The Cats
 The Bastard (1963 film), a Japanese youth film directed by Seijun Suzuki

Literature
 "Bâtard" ("Bastard" or "Mongrel"), a 1902 short story by Jack London
 Der momzer (The Bastard), a Yiddish play by Jacob Mikhailovich Gordin
 The Bastard (novel), a 1974 novel by John Jakes
 The Bastard, a 1929 novel by Erskine Caldwell

Music

Albums
 Bastard (Tyler, the Creator mixtape) (2009)
 Bastard (Subway to Sally album) (2007)
 Bastard, a 1992 album by Kat
 Bastard (Stahlmann album) (2017)
 The Bastard (album), a 2001 album by Hammers of Misfortune
 Bastard (Colin Newman album) (1997)

Songs
 "Bastard" (Mötley Crüe song) (1983)
 "The Bastard", a 2000 song by Phil Anselmo and Tony Iommi
 "Bastard", a 2003 song by David Byrne from Lead Us Not into Temptation
 "Bastard", a 2002 song by Diary of Dreams from Freak Perfume
 "Bastard", a 2005 song by Dope from American Apathy
 "Bastard", a 2003 song by Dysrhythmia from Pretest
 "Bastard", a 2005 song by Ben Folds from Songs for Silverman
 "Bastard", a 1979 song by Ian Hunter from You're Never Alone with a Schizophrenic
 "Bastard", a 1998 song by Oomph! from Unrein
 "The Bastard", a 1995 song by Pet Lamb from Sweaty Handshake
 "Bastard", a 2012 song by Soulfly from the deluxe edition of Enslaved
 "Bastard", a 1997 song by Devin Townsend from Ocean Machine: Biomech
 "The Bastard", a 2000 song by the Tragically Hip from Music @ Work

Other uses in arts, entertainment, and media
 The Bastard (miniseries), a 1978 television miniseries based on John Jakes' novel
 Bastard!!, a manga by Kazushi Hagiwara

Fonts
 Bastard (typeface), a blackletter typeface
 Bastarda or bastard, a Gothic script

Other uses
 Bastard (color), a type of color gel
 Bastard Township, Ontario, Canada
 Bastard, a classification of the teeth of a metalworking file
 Bastard, a second-rate wine, distinguished from sack
 The Bastard, the horse that won the 1930 Yorkshire Cup

See also
 
 
 The Bastard (disambiguation)
 Bastardisation (disambiguation)
 Bastardia, a genus of flowering plants
 Bastardo (disambiguation)
 Bastards (disambiguation)
 Bastardy (film), a 2008 Australian documentary film
 Bastardy (play), a 1972 play by Australian playwright John Romeril
 Baster, a descendant of liaisons between the Cape Colony Dutch and indigenous Africans
 Alan and Sara B'Stard, characters in The New Statesman